The 2008–09 season was Swansea City A.F.C.'s first time in the second tier of English football for 24 years. Swansea gained promotion as champions of League One by 10 points.

Squad statistics

Playing stats

Last updated on 10 March 2009

|}

No longer at the club

|}

Disciplinary record

For games in the 2008–09 Championship.

For games in the 2008–09 League Cup.

For games in the 2008–09 FA Cup.

Awards

Manager of the Month

January:  Roberto Martínez

Player of the Month

February:  Jason Scotland

Championship Team of the Week

The following Swansea players have been selected in the official Championship team of the week.

26 August 2008:  Àngel Rangel 
6 October 2008:  Ashley Williams,  Jason Scotland 
27 October 2008:  Artur Krysiak,  Jordi Gómez
3 November 2008:  Dimitrios Konstantopoulos,  Jordi Gómez 
1 December 2008:  Leon Britton 
30 December 2008:  Darren Pratley 
12 January 2009:  Garry Monk,  Jason Scotland 
19 January 2009:  Joe Allen 
2 February 2009:  Jordi Gómez 
9 February 2009:  Jordi Gómez,  Jason Scotland 
23 February 2009:  Jordi Gómez 
6 April 2009:  Nathan Dyer 
15 April 2009:  Leon Britton,  Ashley Williams,  Jason Scotland 
20 April 2009:  Garry Monk

Player transfers

In

Out

Loans in

Loans out

Fixtures and results

Pre-season friendlies
Swansea City scores given first

The Championship

The season finished on 3 May when Swansea City played Blackpool at the Liberty Stadium.

Results by round

The FA Cup

League Cup
Swansea reached the Fourth round of the League Cup before losing to Championship strugglers Watford.

References

2008-09
2008–09 Football League Championship by team
Welsh football clubs 2008–09 season